Robert Aaron Williams (May 5, 1961 – March 10, 2014), was an American professional basketball player who was selected by the Denver Nuggets in the first round (19th pick overall) of the 1982 NBA draft.

A 6-foot-2 point guard from the University of Houston, Williams played in two National Basketball Association (NBA) seasons for the Nuggets.  When Williams reported to Denver's training camp as a rookie, he was badly out of shape, prompting Nuggets coach Doug Moe to describe Williams as "a fat little hog".

Williams' collegiate career included a trip to the 1982 NCAA Final Four, where his Houston Cougars, better known as Phi Slama Jama, fell to the North Carolina Tar Heels in the National Semifinals.

A former star at Milby High School in Houston, Williams was an electrifying player for the University of Houston, averaging 16 points per game as a freshman, 25 per game as a sophomore, and 21 points per game for the 1982 Final Four team.  Williams was an All American and perennial All Southwest Conference performer.  His collegiate teammates included Hakeem Olajuwon, Clyde Drexler, Michael Young, Benny Anders and Larry Micheaux among others.

In his NBA career, Williams played in 153 games and scored a total of 1,319 points.  Following his brief NBA career, he played professionally in the Continental Basketball Association, Italy, Australia, Spain, and the Philippines.

In 1986, Williams strutted his wares as an import for Tanduay Rhum in the Philippine Basketball Association's (PBA) Reinforced Conference that year, where teams were allowed to suit up two imports no taller than 6 ft 3 in.  Along with partner Andre McKoy and local superstars Ramon Fernandez, Freddie Hubalde and Willie Generalao, among others, the flamboyant and sweet-shooting Williams led Tanduay to its first championship in franchise history.

In a May 2005 Houston Chronicle story, Williams admitted using drugs while he played. He suffered a stroke in January 1998 that left him blind in his left eye and partially paralyzed along the left side of his body.

On March 10, 2014, Rob Williams died of congestive heart failure at age 52.

Since 2005, Williams and his wife had operated a care facility for mentally-challenged adults in Katy, Texas.

References

External links
 
Basketballreference.com page
Rob Williams' death

1961 births
2014 deaths
20th-century African-American sportspeople
21st-century African-American people
African-American basketball players
All-American college men's basketball players
American expatriate basketball people in the Philippines
American men's basketball players
Basketball players from Houston
Denver Nuggets draft picks
Denver Nuggets players
Houston Cougars men's basketball players
Lancaster Lightning players
Louisville Catbirds players
Parade High School All-Americans (boys' basketball)
Philippine Basketball Association imports
Point guards
Tanduay Rhum Masters players